Caleb Newbold Taylor (July 27, 1813 – November 15, 1887) was a Republican member of the U.S. House of Representatives from Pennsylvania.

Early life

Caleb Newbold Taylor was born near Newportville, Pennsylvania.  He was engaged in agricultural pursuits, and served as a delegate to the Whig State convention at Harrisburg, Pennsylvania, in 1832.  He was an unsuccessful candidate for election to Congress in 1848, 1850, and again in 1852.  He was a delegate to the 1860 Republican National Convention.

United States House of Representatives

Taylor was elected as a Republican to the Fortieth Congress.  He successfully contested the election of John R. Reading to the Forty-first Congress.

Later, he was engaged in banking, and served as president of the Farmers’ National Bank of Bristol, Bucks County, Pennsylvania, from 1875 until his death at his home, “Sunbury Farm,” near Newportville.  Interment in the Friends Burying Ground in Bristol, Pennsylvania.

Sources

The Political Graveyard

External links

1813 births
1887 deaths
American bankers
People from Bucks County, Pennsylvania
Republican Party members of the United States House of Representatives from Pennsylvania
19th-century American politicians
19th-century American businesspeople